Allegra Huston (born 26 August 1964) is a British-American author, editor and writer based in Taos, New Mexico. She is the author of Love Child: A Memoir of Family Lost and Found, the novel A Stolen Summer (Say My Name in hardback), and How to Edit and Be Edited, and is co-author with James Navé of How to Read for an Audience. She is also the screenwriter and producer of the short film Good Luck, Mr Gorski.

Life 
Huston was born on 26 August 1964 in London, England. Her mother was ballerina Enrica Soma, and her father was The 2nd Viscount Norwich.
When Huston was four, her mother died in a car accident and she subsequently moved to Ireland, where she was raised by her mother's estranged husband, film director John Huston (1906–87). Allegra Huston's half-siblings include actress and director Anjelica Huston, writer Tony Huston, actor and director Danny Huston, writer Artemis Cooper and The 3rd Viscount Norwich.

Career 
After earning a degree in English from Hertford College, Oxford, Huston began a career in book publishing, first at Chatto & Windus and then at Weidenfeld & Nicolson, where she was editorial director from 1990 to 1994. After two years as Acquisition and Development Consultant at Pathe Films, London, she left to write and edit as a freelancer. Articles by Huston have appeared in numerous publications, including The Times, Tatler, The Independent on Sunday, Mail on Sunday, YOU magazine, Harper's Bazaar, Newsweek, Mothering, and People. She was on the editorial staff of the biannual art and culture magazine Garage for seven years.

Huston is the co-founder of Imaginative Storm Writing Workshops. They have taught multiday workshops in many places around the world. She has also taught at the University of Oklahoma and the Arvon Foundation.

Personal
Huston is the mother of a son, Rafael.

Published works
Love Child: A Memoir of Family Lost and Found, published in April 2009 by Simon & Schuster (US) and Bloomsbury (UK). 
Say My Name: A Novel (London: HQ, July 2017; New York: MIRA, January 2018), republished in paperback as A STOLEN SUMMER  (2019)
Twice 5 Miles Guides: How to Edit and Be Edited and How to Read for an Audience (with James Navé)

References

External links

1964 births
English emigrants to the United States
English women novelists
Living people
American women screenwriters
English screenwriters
English editors
Writers from Taos, New Mexico
Writers from London
21st-century British novelists
21st-century American women writers
Allegra
American writers of Italian descent
English people of Italian descent
Alumni of Hertford College, Oxford
English people of American descent
Daughters of viscounts
Screenwriters from New Mexico
21st-century American screenwriters
21st-century British screenwriters
21st-century English women
21st-century English people